Ceylon is the name given to a family of curry recipes with the key ingredients being coconut, lime, and a specific Ceylon curry powder, which classifies it as "hot" on most guides.

External links

Sri Lankan curries